James is a 2008 Northern Irish coming-of-age short film.  The film stars Niall Wright as James, a teenage boy attempting to come to terms with his burgeoning homosexuality.

Plot summary
James (Niall Wright) is a withdrawn and secretive teenager, coming from a family with long-buried secrets. With no friends and a refusal to confide with his parents (Margaret Goodman and Gerry Doherty), he faces an inner battle as he comes to terms with his sexuality. His literature teacher, Mr. Sutherland (Matt Jennings), is his sole beacon of hope, believing that he may understand the trouble he faces. However, in his moment of need, Sutherland, concerned by the risks involved, fails to provide James with the support he needs. Devoid of hope, he makes an audacious decision to turn to seemingly the last person who can help, an old man (Louis Rolston) that he meets in the public toilets.

Reception
The film won Best Northern Irish Short at the Belfast Film Festival, the Iris Prize for Best UK Short, and Best International Short at the St. Louis International Film Festival in 2008. In January, it beat 6,000 other entries to be one of 22 short films that was selected for the International Dramatic Competition at Sundance Film Festival. It was also part of the Sundance iTunes 10/10.

Awards 
April 2008 Best Northern Irish Film, Belfast Film Festival 2008
August 2008 Best Short Gaze Dublin International Lesbian & Gay Film Festival 2008
August 2008 Jury Award Best Student Short Palm Springs Shortfest 2008
October 2008 Iris Prize Festival Best UK Short 2008
October 2008 Outlook Award Best LGBT Short Film 53rd Corona Cork Film Festival
October 2008 Fort Lauderdale International Film Festival Award of Merit
November 2008 Best International Short 17th Annual Saint Louis International Film Festival
April 2009 Bronze Palm Award, Mexico International Film Festival
May 2009 Best Foreign Film, NYC Downtown Short Film Festival

References

External links

2008 films
2008 short films
British LGBT-related films
British short films
British teen LGBT-related films
LGBT-related coming-of-age films
LGBT-related short films
2008 LGBT-related films
2000s English-language films
2000s British films